The following localities in Småland were granted a charter and town privileges from circa 1200 up until 1856:

The local government reform of 1863 made the individual charters obsolete and created the concept of municipalities in Sweden. The above mentioned localities with town priviligies were instituted as municipalities with the title of stad (city/town).

During the 20th century these localities were instituted as städer:

After 1951 no more städer were instituted and the local government reform of 1971 saw the abolishment of the term, replacing it with kommun for all municipalities, regardless of former status.

Today there is no official definition, but in some contexts (such as Sveriges Nationalatlas) localities with over 10,000 inhabitants are regarded as cities.

Urban areas in order of size
Below is a list of localities in the three administrative counties of Småland with a population greater than 10,000 as of 2005.

 Jönköping, 84,423 
 Växjö, 59,600
 Kalmar, 35,710
 Västervik, 20,694
 Värnamo, 18,469
 Trelleborg, 25,643
 Oskarshamn, 17,143
 Nässjö, 14,810
 Ljungby, 17,286
 Tranås, 14,017
 Vetlanda, 12,691
 Nybro, 12,598
 Gislaved, 10.091

See also
Stad (Sweden)
Municipalities of Sweden
Urban areas in Sweden

Towns in Smaland
Småland